Resource consumption is about the consumption of non-renewable, or less often, renewable resources. Specifically, it may refer to:

 water consumption
 energy consumption
 electric energy consumption
 world energy consumption
 natural gas consumption/gas depletion
 oil consumption/oil depletion
 logging/deforestation
 fishing/overfishing 
 land use/land loss or
 resource depletion and
 general exploitation and associated environmental degradation

Measures of resource consumption are resource intensity and resource efficiency. Industrialization and globalized markets have increased the tendency for overconsumption of resources. The resource consumption rate of a nation does not usually correspond with the primary resource availability, this is called resource curse.

Unsustainable consumption by the steadily growing human population may lead to resource depletion and a shrinking of the earth's carrying capacity.

See also 
Ecological footprint
Jevons paradox
Natural resource management
Scarcity
Uneconomic growth

References

External links

Ecology
Resource economics
Consumption